The Alexander Theatre (also known as The Alex) is a theatre in Braamfontein, Johannesburg, South Africa.

History 
The theatre was originally founded as the Johannesburg Repertory Theatre (also known as the Reps' Theatre), seating 550 people in a Scandinavian design. It opened in Braamfontein in November 1951 as the home of the Johannesburg Repertory Players (Johannesburg Reps).

On March 10, 1960, it was renamed the Alexander Theatre after Muriel Alexander, the founder of the Johannesburg Reps. It opened with Hugh Goldie's production of George Bernard Shaw's Caesar and Cleopatra. The theatre was later used for professional performances by the Reps as well as by other companies. The Reps' last performance here was held in 1969: Noël Coward's Present Laughter. Later, TRUK (Transvaal Performing Arts Center) leased it, and around 1978, that arts council purchased it. In the 1990s, the theatre's doors closed due to a drop in attendance with a performance of Ipi Thombi, and by 1997 the building was in a neglected state.

In 2006, Adam Levy bought and restored the theatre as part of his urban renewal program in Braamfontein. As much as possible of the original architecture has been preserved. The new venue opened in July 2007 with Hazel Feldman's production of the rock musical Rent.

Present 
The theatre is used as a versatile space for a variety of occasions: concerts, TV programs, parties, conferences, award ceremonies, and charity performances. The auditorium seats 536 people, and there are other rooms available as well.

References

External links 
 Official website

Buildings and structures in Johannesburg
Culture of Johannesburg
Theatres in South Africa